Queensland Premier Rugby is a semi professional club rugby union competition in Queensland, Australia. Nine clubs play in the competition, eight clubs are from Brisbane, and one club is from Gold Coast.The premiership has been contested in its present form since 1929.

History 
Queensland Premier Rugby (QPR) evolved out of the Brisbane club competition that had been running since 1887. It was created by players, administrators, referees and coaches to expand and improve the top level of Queensland non-professional rugby. QPR provides Queensland rugby players a stepping stone for selection into the Queensland Reds and other teams in Super Rugby or other professional rugby competitions.

Previous to 1920, the Hospitals Challenge Cup was established as a fund-raising exercise for the Brisbane General Hospital. After the devastation of World War I the competition was suspended until the Hospitals Cup was established. The Brisbane Club competition recommenced in 1929.

The 1975 Grand Final was played between the Brothers club and GPS and Brothers won the match. Teachers-Norths, Wests and again Brothers won the next seasons. In 1979, the first ever draw in a final occurred with a 24-all draw between rivals University and Brothers, a reply of the final was held, which saw University defeat Brothers by a mere 3 points. Brothers dominated the next few seasons, winning the 1980 to 1984 premierships. Souths won their first title in 1986, and University won a number of titles at the end of the decade.

Souths came to major prominence during the 1990s, winning the competition five times in a row from 1991 through to 1995, and then again in 1998 and 2000. They also featured in the 1996 season final which GPS won, and the 1997 final which Easts won. Canberra also competed in the competition, and found major success, winning three titles in a row from 2001 to 2003. The Gold Coast Breakers also began to become a force in the competition, featuring in five finals from 2001 to 2007, although they were on the receiving end of the competitions largest ever grand final score being thrashed 85-19 by the Sunnybank Dragons in the 2007 Grand Final.

In future, teams from other Rugby regions in Queensland may also join the competition, thus encouraging the pursuit of Rugby excellence across the state, not just confining it Queensland's south-east corner. However at a meeting of the Sunshine Coast Rugby Union in October 2013, it was decided by the members not to compete in the 2014 QRU’s Premier Rugby Competition, but will instead focus its energy on becoming the leading force in regional rugby.

Other trophies
Thomas Welsby Memorial Cup: The top two first grade teams at the end of the first full round of home and away matches contest the Welsby Cup in their second round meeting. The cup was originally donated by Thomas Welsby.

Keith Horsley Memorial Trophy: Now presented to First Grade Minor Premiers, since 1978. The trophy donated by the Family of Sgt Keith Thornton Horsley who was Killed in Action during WW2.

Doughty Challenge Shield: Named for businessman Hector Randall Doughty, a former marine engineer with the Queensland Harbours and Rivers Department and lightweight champion boxer, the Doughty Shield is awarded annually to the champion Brisbane club, based on competition points won across all participating grades.

Teams

Former Teams 

  Gold Coast
  Sunshine Coast
  Canberra

Grand Final results, Hospital Cup winners (since 1946)
 
 
Total Premierships (since 1946)

Former clubs (since 1929)
 B.G.S. Old Boys, Y.M.C.A., Valleys, Wynnum, Past Commercials/Technical College Old Boys
 West End, South Brisbane, Combined High School Old Boys, Starlights (Ipswich)
 Valley Playground Old Boys, Eagle Junction, New Farm, Bretts-Windsor
 Mayne, Windsor, R.A.A.F.
 Maristonians, Police, Northern Districts 
 United Services, R.A.A.F. Amberley, Army
 Teachers, Gold Coast Eagles, Q.I.T./Colleges, Ipswich Rangers
 Redcliffe, Teachers-Norths, Kenmore 
 Canberra Vikings, Sunshine Coast Stingrays, Gold Coast Breakers

See also

 Australian club championship rugby union
 Queensland Suburban Rugby Union
 Brisbane City
 Queensland Reds
 National Rugby Championship
 List of Australian club rugby union competitions

Notes

References

External links 

 Queensland Premier Rugby
 Queensland Rugby Club

Rugby union competitions in Queensland
Rugby union leagues in Australia
Recurring sporting events established in 1887
1887 establishments in Australia
Sports leagues established in 1887